Henri Gance (17 March 1888 – 29 November 1953) was a French weightlifter who won a gold medal at the 1920 Summer Olympics in Antwerp, representing France.

Gance took up weightlifting in 1908 and was a French champion in 1920.

References

External links

1888 births
1953 deaths
Sportspeople from Paris
French male weightlifters
Olympic weightlifters of France
Weightlifters at the 1920 Summer Olympics
Olympic gold medalists for France
Olympic medalists in weightlifting
Medalists at the 1920 Summer Olympics
20th-century French people